Indonesia Soccer Championship A, also known as Torabika Soccer Championship presented by IM3 Ooredoo for sponsorship reasons, was a football competition that replaced the temporarily-suspended Indonesia Super League.

Persipura won the title on the final matchday.

Teams 
Eighteen teams competed in this tournament – all teams from the abandoned 2015 Indonesia Super League.

Name changes 
 Persipasi Bandung Raya were relocated to Pamekasan and renamed Madura United.
 Persiram were bought by the Indonesian National Armed Forces, and relocated to Bandung as PS TNI.
 Persebaya ISL were (after temporary name changes to Persebaya United, Bonek, and Surabaya United, following an injunction to use the name Persebaya) renamed to Bhayangkara Surabaya United (as a merger with Indonesian National Police club PS Polri). On 10 September 2016, Bhayangkara Surabaya United changed name to Bhayangkara and were relocated to Sidoarjo.

Stadium and locations 

Notes:

Personnel and kits
Note: Flags indicate national team as has been defined under FIFA eligibility rules. Players and Managers may hold more than one non-FIFA nationality.

Additionally, referee kits are made by Joma and Nike supplied the match ball.

Coaching changes

Foreign players
Football Association of Indonesia restricted the number of foreign players to four per team, including one slot for a player from AFC countries. Teams can use all the foreign players at once.
Players name in bold indicates the player was registered during the mid-season transfer window.
Players in italics were out of squad or left club within the season, after pre-season transfer window, or in the mid-season transfer window, and at least had one appearance.

League table

Results

Top goalscorers

Attendances

See also
 2016 Indonesia Soccer Championship B
 2016 Liga Nusantara
 2016 Indonesia Soccer Championship U-21
 2016 Soeratin Cup

References

External links
Liga Indonesia official site 
FBDB / Footballdatabase.eu Helping Database 
Data Lengkap Liga ISC A 

Indonesia
Indonesia
2016 in Indonesian sport